can refer to the early literary medium that circulated in Edo-period (1603–1867) Japan, circa 1661–1748, to the  manga that was the dominant form of literary entertainment in Japan during the post-WWII period around 1946 to 1950 or to the compilation of past exam papers that aid university applicants in their academic preparation. Early akahon were softcover booklets featuring woodblock printed illustrations.  belonged to a family of coloured books named , which were colour coded by genre.  were distinguished from other  by its red cover and coverage of less mature subject matters such as children's tales, fairy tales and folk legends.  were the primary type of book in the  style, meaning that in many cases, it was the first interaction with the world of literature for many Japanese children, so publishers would use plentiful illustrations and simple entertaining plots as the focal points to capture the attention of the young Japanese readership. 

The more modern  manga shared the signature red covers with the early  but its content differed due to the advent of the printing press and the influence of foreign media.  manga featured bold colours and well known characters, as disregard to copyright laws was a defining feature of this genre, with authors often blatantly basing their novels off of well-known American characters, such as Disney's Three Little Pigs and Betty Boop.

The compilation of university exam paper that is named  is mostly used by university applicants to prepare for their university admission exams.  are typically divided into the different universities they contain the past papers for, with sections in the books further divided into the different test subjects, such as Mathematics, English Studies, Japanese, etc. Many students attend , in conjunction with using the  resource to familiarise themselves with both the exam format and the content. Since  are relatively expensive, students looking for extra study materials use  as a way of improving their knowledge for the fiercely competitive exams.  can be bought online as well as in many Japanese bookstores.

Historical origin 
Much of the understanding of early  is dependent upon historical discoveries of these text types.

Scholars speculate on the reasons why  gradually replaced , with theories spanning from greater commercial viability as a book of bigger format to accommodating more visual-verbal content. An  was typically just 10 pages long, though often, groups of up to 3  were collated and bound together with string.

Slowly,  would be overshadowed by emerging literary mediums, such as manga.

was the family of children's books to which  belonged. There are several explanations for why they are named "grass books." Another theory is that  relates to the "grass style" of calligraphy with which the tales are inscribed. Out of these three texts,  is most notable, as many sources believe that modern manga was a direct descendant of the books with yellow covers. These texts were targeted at more mature audiences and their subject matter reflects this fact, as they covered the darker side of the human condition, such as mortality, infidelity, horror or hopelessness. Soon after,  publishers started to lengthen the structure of their stories, incorporating complex heroes and expansive plotlines such that the resultant work had the length of multiple standard  leaflets, necessitating the coinage of the new term , meaning "bound volumes".

In this way,  can be seen as a type of social commentary in the way that it re-interpreted the Muromachi-period classics, as it reveals an insight into how society viewed the themes presented in these works.

However, other sources seek to categorize the Edo narrative in a different manner. For example, the term  can be translated roughly to mean "fashionable humour," and focuses primarily on the pleasure quarters of Kyoto. The text type is distinguishable by the strong presence of an authorial voice which conveys concern for readership and acts as the benchmark upon which expectations of social and behavioural norms are created, the abrogations of which create humour.  was a text type that, unlike , did not rely heavily on illustrations to entertain its audience and instead, used its characters and the moral situations in which they found themselves entangled in to deliver moralistic lessons to readers.

Notable  
An early publisher of many  was Urokogataya Magobei, who is known for having published the  texts of Bunta the Salt Seller and the Princess Hachikazuki. A common theme of these works is that they are concise reproductions of other prominent works in Edo at the time. It must be noted that Magobei did not produce exclusively using the  medium. His works range from the  format to  formats. Publishers would factor in the type of content they were producing, the length of the overall books and also the amount of illustrations they would incorporate in their work in order to choose the colour of the book and thus give the reader a preliminary expectation of the content they would find between the covers. Magobei's second son, Nishimuraya Yohachi, continued his father's legacy, albeit in a different art form.

The Old Yarn of Peach Boy is an example of an  that is attributed to the artist Nishimura Shigenobu. In the story, there is a scene of a woman kneeling by the bank of a river and floating towards her is a peach, from which will emerge the titular protagonist of the story. The dominant presence of the illustrations compared to the sparse text is characteristic of the akahon text type. In another scene from Princess Hachikazuki, the queen is shown bestowing jewels upon the head of her daughter on her deathbed and covering them with a large bowl. After the queen dies and the princess attempts to remove the bowl from her head, she discovers that it is stuck fast, giving rise to her name, which translates to "Princess who wears a Bowl on her Head".

In Bunta the Salt Seller, although the story's protagonist, Bunta, is a poor man, who peddles the salt he dries from his local river, his luck changes due to his good deeds. In this scene, he is depicted releasing two mandarin ducks from captivity, who reveal that they are actually a samurai married couple who were transformed by a jealous villain. The samurai proceed to assist Bunta, reversing his fortunes.

manga 
 inspired the contemporary form of media known as manga from its entertainment centered content to its many genre. In fact, early forms of manga were known as " manga," despite the loss of its signature red cover. After World War II, Japanese society shunned  as a vulgar medium that negatively influenced Japanese youths with violent and erotic themes. A common criticism of  manga was that they were designed to entice children into paying for them and that they had no real substantive value. Holmberg sums up this view by asserting that for  manga, "content was an afterthought". In this comparison of the cover of an  manga and its contents, it is evident that the vibrant colour scheme and art design of the cover were not representative of the contents of the manga.

This genre aimed to bridge the gap between education and entertainment for Japanese children, with limited success, due to a lack of public support of the manga. This is most likely due to the conflict between the didactic nature of these manga and the preconceived notion that manga should be enjoyed entirely for its creative and entertaining appeal.

Consumers were enabled to borrow titles for a small fee from local shops, which can be seen as a "precursor of modern libraries". Postwar  manga was available in a number of different avenues; from the aforementioned rental book stores, in candy stores, on the streets by peddlers or from a subscription with Tokyo-based magazines, which were typically issued monthly.

A successful genre of  manga was war manga, focusing on past historical periods. Printed media as a medium was limited in its timeliness; commentary on current issues was better suited to the evolving television medium. In response to the growing viewership of television sets, publishers set out to develop their readerships by carving out their own niche;  focusing on past historical periods in a documentary style. This approach was successful;  manga had devised a way to compete and keep up with the fast pace of television broadcasts. Not only did this configuration and retelling of past historical periods have a commercial success, it was also important for the Japanese people culturally. Facing an uncertain future following the Second World War, the Japanese people found pride in the retelling of their national past, using  and other such mediums to paint images of heroic fighter plane pilots and war heroes. This positive reconfiguration served both as a memento of those that gave their lives for the nation and as a positive role model for Japanese youth moving forward into that uncertain future.

References 

Japanese books
Edo history
Japanese words and phrases